Barbara Emerson is an English historian and biographer, known for her biography of King Leopold II of Belgium. She was also a fellow of St Hilda's College, Oxford.

Emerson received her degree in PPE from St Hilda's College, Oxford where she later taught.

She was highly critical of Adam Hochschild's book King Leopold's Ghost, rebuking it in The Guardian as "a very shoddy piece of work."

Works
 The Black Prince (1976)
 Leopold II of the Belgians: King of Colonialism (1979)
 Paul Delvaux (1985)

References

Year of birth missing (living people)
Living people
English historians
English biographers
Alumni of St Hilda's College, Oxford
Fellows of St Hilda's College, Oxford
Historians of Belgium